The city of Phnom Penh is served by multiple transport systems including public buses, private taxis and ride-hailing via mobile apps.

Phnom Penh is connected to the rest of the country through the national roads as well as by domestic flights to and from Phnom Penh International Airport.

The Municipality of Phnom Penh is largely responsible for overseeing the public transport in Phnom Penh.

Roads
Road-based transport is the primary source of transport in Phnom Penh. It consists of taxis, tuk tuks and private transportation.

Buses

As of 2020, the public bus transportation in Phnom Penh consists of 17 lines:

Since 2014, air conditioned buses have run along three main bus routes across the city, managed by the Phnom Penh Municipal Government and formerly sponsored by the Japanese International Cooperation Agency. Line A travels north/south along Monivong Boulevard going around Wat Phnom (stop 21), the Central Market (stop 30) and near the Tuol Sleng Genocide Museum (Stop 41), Olympic Stadium (stop 37), the Royal Palace and the National Museum of Cambodia (stop 35). Line B serves the western side along Mao Tse Tung Boulevard, going much further south to Ta Khmao, capital of the Kandal Province near the Choeung Ek Genocidal Centre. Line C goes east/west Phnom Penh along the Russian Confederation Boulevard to Phnom Penh International Airport BRT station. The fare for the public buses is KHR1500 per voyage irrespective of distance. Students and senior citizens travel free as of 2015.

Public transport operates between 5:30am to 8pm.

Phnom Penh City Bus will be use BYD electric bus that are currently in operational test.

Taxis
Taxis appear in the form of cars, motorcycles, and tuk-tuk. Motorcycle taxis are a common and unregulated form of public transport, common in Phnom Penh.

Ride-hailing via mobile apps has become a popular mean of transportation within Phnom Penh. After acquiring Uber, Grab has become the largest ride-hailing service in Phnom Penh and Siem Reap, offering car, tuktuk and motorbike services. A local based ride-hailing app, PassApp is also widely used in Phnom Penh.

Rail
The only form of rail transport in Phnom Penh is the airport shuttle train operated by Royal Railway. The journey from Phnom Penh International Airport to the city centre, and vice versa takes under 40 minutes. The airport train first began service on 10 April 2018.

In 2016, the Cambodian government announced that they were getting assistance from Japan International Cooperation Agency (JICA) to conduct a feasibility study on an AGT system in Phnom Penh. The study began in 2017 and was completed and submitted to the Ministry of Works and Public Transport in 2019.

Separately, in 2019, the government has also awarded contracts to two Chinese firms to conduct feasibility studies on both a metro and a light rail system.

Airports
Phnom Penh is served by Phnom Penh International Airport, the largest airport in terms of land area in Cambodia.

A new larger international airport is being built at Kandal province, south of Phnom Penh and will replace the existing airport once fully completed.

See also
 Phnom Penh City Bus
 Transport in Cambodia
 Rail transport in Cambodia
 Phnom Penh International Airport

References

External links
 Cambodians board Phnom Penh's first public buses in more than a decade, The Guardian 
 Public Bus System Works, But Needs Improvement, Riders Say 
 Official Page of Phnom Penh Municipal Bus Services

 
Phnom Penh
Phnom Penh